Richard Fowns (1560?–1625), was an English divine.

Fowns, 'a minister's son and Worcestershire man born,' was elected student of Christ Church, Oxford, in 1577, at the age of seventeen, and graduated B.A. 30 January 1581, M.A. 3 April 1585. He took the degrees of B.D. and D.D. by accumulation, 16 May 1605. He became chaplain to Prince Henry, and in 1602 was rector of Severn Stoke, Worcestershire, in the church of which he was buried 25 November 1625. His monument was 'miserably defaced' during the English Civil War.

He was the author of: 1. ' [on 2 Thess. ii. 3, 4] ,' 4to, London, 1606, dedicated to Henry, prince of Wales. 2. ',' London, 1619, a stout quarto of 782 pages, inscribed to Prince Charles.

References

1560 births
1625 deaths
English chaplains
Clergy from Worcestershire
Alumni of Christ Church, Oxford
16th-century English writers
16th-century male writers
17th-century English writers
17th-century English male writers
17th-century English Anglican priests